Zinc finger protein 193 is a protein that in humans is encoded by the ZNF193 gene.

References

Further reading